Lenggong (Jawi: لڠڬوڠ) is a town, a mukim and a parliamentary constituency in Hulu Perak District, Perak, Malaysia. The Lenggong valley in Hulu Perak is one of Peninsular Malaysia's most important areas for archaeology, as excavations have revealed many traces of Malaysia's prehistory. It is the site of the oldest known place of human activity in the Peninsula. Today it is still a rural area, with small kampongs surrounded by green vegetation and limestone hills. Lenggong can be likened to an open-air museum, and is home to legends, skeletons, cave drawings and precious finds such as jewellery, pottery, weapons and stone tools. Many of the caves in the Lenggong area have revealed evidence of ancient humans having lived and hunted in this area. The Lenggong Valley was listed by UNESCO as a World Heritage site on 30 June 2012.

Lenggong Town

Lenggong is accessible by trunk roads connecting it with neighbouring towns and cities. The town of Lenggong is situated some 100 kilometres north of Ipoh on the Kuala Kangsar to Grik road (highway 76). The road to Lenggong is surrounded mostly by oil palm estates and jungles. As cows and buffalo are part of the agriculture, they are often seen along the road. The jungles (about million years old) are now in danger of heavy illegal logging.

To visit Lenggong, from the North–South Expressway take Exit No.143 at Kuala Kangsar – that's about 3 hours away from Kuala Lumpur. Then take Route 76 to Lenggong. The new highway is open and has replaced the old scenic kampung road.

Lenggong federal constituency and autonomous sub-district

The Lenggong federal constituency is represented in the Dewan Rakyat of the Malaysian Parliament by Dato Shamsul Anuar bin Haji Nasarah from UMNO. Lenggong also contributes two seats to the Perak State Legislative Assembly: Kota Tampan and Kenering, which were also held by UMNO.

Lenggong is also an autonomous sub-district (daerah kecil), consisting of Lenggong town and the nearby communes of Durian Pipit and Temelong.

Archaeology

Malaysia is considered a very young country archaeologically with a very recent prehistory. In Africa, the predecessors of the human species originated about 3 – 5 million years ago. Their descendants migrated out of Africa and their prehistoric remains have been found all over Europe and Asia. Both Java Man and Peking Man date back to about 300,000 years ago. In Malaysia, the earliest remains is a human skull found in the Niah Caves in Sarawak and dates back some 40,000 years. In Semenanjung (Peninsula) Malaysia, the story is even more recent and starts in Lenggong about 31,000 years ago. Incidentally, many people think of the Bujang Valley in Kedah as being one of the oldest sites, but its history only stretches back about 1,500 years. All the archaeological remains found in Lenggong have been associated with caves. The two exceptions are the Kota Tampan and Bukit Jawa sites. These two are Peninsular Malaysia's only Palaeolithic sites.

Kota Tampan is the earliest known site of human inhabitation. Excavations at Kota Tampan which began in 1938 revealed an undisturbed stone tool production area. Pebble tools were made using equipment such as anvils and hammer stones. Some 50,000 pieces of stone have been found and recorded. The culture at Kota Tampan is referred to as Tampanian. The workshop was initially dated at 30,000 years old, but this figure has now been revised to 75,000 years. Although the Kota Tampan workshop site is currently on a hillside, and in an oil palm plantation, the original site was on a lake shore. It is thought that the workshop was disbanded roughly 75,000 years ago due to a volcanic eruption at Lake Toba in Sumatra, some 250 kilometres away. There is a large gap of some 17,000 years between Kota Tampan and the next archaeological site, Gua Gunung Runtuh, which has been attributed to the devastating effects of the Toba eruption.

More recently, a team has been excavating a site at Bukit Jawa, and this has been dated at 200,000 years old. Bukit Jawa is therefore far older than the Kota Tampan workshop, which is just 6 km away.

The Lenggong Valley in upper Perak, is an important archaeological site where evidences of human settlement from the Palaeolithic age were found. Important archaeological sites include Kota Tampan, Bukit Jawa at Kampung Gelok and Kampung Temelong. The most famous archaeological findings in Lenggong was Perak Man, the 11,000 years old human skeletal remains which was discovered in 1991.100,000-year-old stone tools have been excavated at Kampung Geluk and Kampung Temelong. There has also been proof that Gua Harimau was a site of bronze manufacture during the Bronze Age. There is also the Lenggong Archaeological Museum at Kota Tampan where artefacts excavated from the area are displayed. The museum is located within an oil palm estate on the road from Kuala Kangsar to Gerik (or Grik).

Lenggong's prehistory extends back to the Palaeolithic or old Stone Age, but most sites are more recent, from the Neolithic or new Stone Age. The Palaeolithic period occurred from 2 million – 10,000 years ago, and the people at that time were the first tool makers, who lived by hunting and gathering. During the new Stone Age the tools had been improved, and pottery was used, and the people practised farming. All the archaeological remains found in Lenggong have been associated with caves, with the exception of Kota Tampan and Bukit Jawa. There remain Peninsular Malaysia's only Palaeolithic sites.

Gua Gunung Runtuh is situated in Bukit Kepala Gajah or Elephant's Head Hill. In the same hill other caves have yielded archaeological remains such as stone tools and food remnants, but no more skeletons. The caves were probably used as temporary shelters as seasonal or hunting camps, whereas Gua Gunung Runtuh was lived in for longer periods. The next oldest site is Gua Harimau or Tiger Cave. It is about 3 kilometres away from Gua Gunung Runtuh and is an isolated site, and was probably used as a burial ground some 5000 – 3000 years ago.

Seven human skeletons have been found (but no tiger bones), also bronze axes, and various articles of jewellery such as chains, bangles, earrings and bead lockets. The bronze axes show that there was an early Bronze tradition in Malaysia, as well as in north Thailand and China. It is the earliest use of metal in south-east Asia. Porcelain containers of various shapes and sizes were also found containing meat and siput shells (a generic name for snails). Archaeological digs in other caves have revealed pottery, axes stone tools and flakes. Also food remains, and in some sites, human bones. Unfortunately some caves have been disturbed by guano diggers and any remains have therefore been lost.

Gua Puteri is a natural tunnel which pierces Bukit Kajang. There are no archaeological findings here, but instead the cave is known for its legends. Two stalagmites are believed to be a prince and princess who guard the cave. Locals say that if children climb up the stalagmites they will fall sick. Negrito cave drawings have been found at various sites but are not prehistoric, as they are only about 100 years old.

Gua Badak is one of the main places for these drawings, situated about 10 kilometres north of Lenggong. The Negritos are one of the aboriginal tribes of Malaysia. The Lanoh Negrito made the illustrative recordings of their every life. The charcoal drawings were first discovered and documented in the 1920s by Ivor Evans. They were then thought to have been lost by quarrying, but were rediscovered in 1992 and hopefully will now be preserved as a national heritage. Luckily most of the drawings survived the blasting, although some are missing, believed destroyed. And unfortunately modern graffiti covers some of the original drawings.

Unlike cave art at places such as Lascaux in France, which date back some 15,000 years, the Negrito drawings are "modern" art. The Negritos used the caves as shelters during hunting trips. The sketches depict tribal art such as animals, people, trees, mats, and even bicycles and motorcars. Apart from the charcoal drawings, they made white pictures by scrapping away the limestone rock. The drawings are simple, featuring matchstick men. There is a man carrying a pole laden with coconuts. A bow and arrow symbolise the hunting tools which were replaced by the blowpipe. There are men on horses, a man with an elephant, a hunting party. Animals such as leaf monkeys, monitor lizards and porcupine all made for a good meal and were therefore illustrated.

The Lanoh Negritos are still found in Perak today, generally working on rubber and oil palm estates, although some do still hunt. They are formed into six tribes. Most of the old troglodytes or cave dwellers of the Malay Peninsula temporarily lived in caves and rock shelters. They lived mainly by hunting, evidence shown by the remains of animal bones and molluscs. The people may have painted their bodies using red iron oxide. They used stones and slabs for grinding up substances such as salt, and all their tools were made of stones. Flakes were used as knives or scrappers. So it can be seen that the Lenggong area is very important as it contains much evidence relating to the prehistory of Malaysia. It is the oldest area where remains have been found, and all the sites are situated conveniently within a small area.

Perak Man
The oldest human skeleton found in Malaysia was at Gua Gunung Runtuh in the state of Perak in Peninsular Malaysia. The cave was his final resting place situated in Bukit Kepala Gajah or Elephant's Head Hill in the Lenggong Valley of Ulu Perak. The skeleton was a male with a height of approximately 157 cm, aged 50s. It was discovered in 1991 and the skeleton has been dated to around 11,000 years old and is one of the most complete skeletons for this time period in this region. In 2004, another skeleton was found at Gua Teluk Kelawar in Lenggong, Perak by a team of Universiti Sains Malaysia (USM) archaeologists. This time it is a 'Perak woman' of 148 cm in height and was believed to aged 40s.

He was buried in the fetal position, with deposits of animal bones at his right shoulder, to his left and to his bottom, and deposits of stone tools around the body. There were no other burials in the cave. The Perak Man had a malformed left hand, his left arm and hand were much smaller compared to his right arm and hand. This deformity could be from a genetic disorder known as brachymesophalangia. This evidence is further supported by the fact that his spine is curved towards the right due to living with only one good hand.

The Perak Man was probably a man as the bones exhibited strong male characteristics. His pelvis wasn't well preserved which is the surest way to determine a skeleton's gender. He shared the characteristics of an australomelanesoid, which is the kind of humans you find in Australia, Papua, Indonesia and some parts of Malaysia. He wasn't very tall, he stood about 154 cm, which is about 5 feet. The bones that were found deposited near him were identified to have come from wild boar, monkey, monitor lizard and deer and are thought to be food deposits. There were about ten stone tools scattered around the body, and most of them were pebble tools and some hammer stones.

One conclusion that the study made was that he must have been an important member in that society because the burial was very elaborate and labour intensive. The Perak Man was put into the pit with food offerings, and then covered him with small shells, and then place more offerings and tools, and then another shell layer, followed by a final dirt layer. Furthermore, he was 45 years old which was very old for a person from that era with a disability. People had to take care of him – and people would not take it upon themselves unless he was respected or highly ranked in some sort of social hierarchy. That's another reason to support the social hierarchy theory.

Of course, it's a bit premature to say all of this about the Perak Man and his society. We should take this with some caution because we don't have anything to benchmark with.

Gua Teluk Kelawar is the cave where Perak Women was found. Perak Women is an 8000-year-old skeleton found in Gua Teluk Kelawar in Lenggong. Perak Women was found more recently in 2004.

Stone tools
An undisturbed stone tool production area where pebble tools were made using equipment such as anvils and hammer stones was excavated at the Kota Tampan archaeological site. The workshop was dated at 75,000 years old.

Cuisine 

Lenggong is also famous for its freshwater fish dishes. One local delicacy from freshwater fish is pekasam, where the fish is marinated in salt and toasted rice, followed by fermentation for two weeks.

References

External links 
Perak Man and the Lenggong Archaeological Museum
Fish dishes of Lenggong
Centre for Archaeological Research Malaysia
 https://web.archive.org/web/20051223085446/http://www.museum.gov.my/english/perakman.htm
 http://allmalaysia.info/news/story.asp?file=/2003/10/4/state/6340195&sec=mi_perak

Archaeological sites in Malaysia
Hulu Perak District
Towns in Perak
Tourist attractions in Perak
World Heritage Sites in Malaysia
Mukims of Perak